Hawsker-cum-Stainsacre is a civil parish in the Scarborough district of North Yorkshire, England.

According to the 2011 UK census, Hawsker-cum-Stainsacre parish had a population of 790, up from the 2001 UK census figure of 763.

There is a small church dedicated to All Saints that is a Grade II listed building.

References

External links

Civil parishes in North Yorkshire